is a Japanese businessperson, actress, and tarento. She is a former member of Yumemiru Adolescence and is the representative director of KYOinc. She moved to the United Kingdom in April 2022.

Biography
When she was in her third grade of elementary school, Kyouka belonged to Tambourine Artists and started performing arts activities. In June 2012, she became a member of the idol music theatre group Yumemiru Adolescence composed of female tarentos who belong to Tambourine Artists. In September 2013, Kyouka won Kodansha Miss iD 2014 personal prize (Imaizumi power award). In December 2013, she made her first stage appearance at Digital Homunculus, chair, and served as the leading actress. From January 2017, Kyouka started DJ activities as DJ Kyouka. On May 19, 2017, it scheduled to release her first solo photo book Thankyouka!!!. On April 12, 2019, Kyouka announced her graduation from the group on April 21, 2019.

On January 22, 2020, Kyouka established her own talent agency, KYOinc. On February 5, she launched the fashion brand Jela.

On August 9, 2020, Kyouka released her solo debut single New Game, for which she also wrote the lyrics.

On November 21, 2020, Kyouka launched a crowdfunding campaign (with a goal of 2 million yen) to create a mini-album, which ended on January 29, 2021 with 28% of its goal (578,000 yen).

In January 2022, Kyouka announced the production of a full nude photo book to mark the end of her gravure activities. The first photos were previewed in the January 4 issue of Friday magazine and the web site Friday Subscription. On March 4, her final photo book, titled Frontera, was released by Kodansha.

In April 2022, Kyouka moved to the United Kingdom and started her study at a language school.

Works

Videos

Photo albums

Filmography

Television

Advertisements

Films

Stage

Events

Others

Model appearances

Magazines

Book

Others

Notes

References

External links
 – Wayback Machine (archived on 7 Nov 2016) 
 – Ameba Blog 
 
16 Kyouka Miss ID | Transit General Office Inc. 
 
 
 

Japanese idols
21st-century Japanese actresses
Musicians from Saitama Prefecture
1999 births
Living people
Japanese expatriates in the United Kingdom
Japanese businesspeople